Edgard may refer to the following:

Edgard, Louisiana
Edgard Félix Pierre Jacobs
Edgard Varèse

See also
Eadgar (disambiguation)
Edgar (disambiguation)
Edgardo

French masculine given names